{{Infobox television
| image                =
| num_episodes         = 116
| genre                = TelenovelaRomanceDrama
| creator              = Caridad Bravo Adams
| based_on             = Cañaveral de Pasionesby Caridad Bravo Adams
| director             = David Grimberg
| writer               = Juan Carlos Acalá
| starring             = Bianca CastanhoGustavo HaddadDébora DuarteHelena FernandesJandir FerrariOscar MagriniThierry FigueiraAna Cecília Costa
| opentheme            = "Incêndio no Canavial", by Moacyr Franco
| endtheme             = "Incêndio no Canavial", by Moacyr Franco
| theme_music_composer = 
| language             = Portuguese
| country              = Brazil
| runtime              = 41-44 minutes
| company              = SBT
| distributor          = SBT
| location             = São Bento dos CanaviaisBrazil
| channel              = SBT
| audio_format         = 
| picture_format       = PAL-M
| first_aired          = 
| last_aired           = 
| executive_producer   = Angelli Nesma Medina
| cinematography       = 
| editor               = 
| preceded_by          = 
| followed_by          = 
| related              = Cañaveral de Pasiones (original series) 
}}Canavial de Paixões (Sugarcane Field of Passions) is a Brazilian telenovela produced and shown by the Sistema Brasileiro de Televisão from 13 October 2003 through 22 March 2004. Based the original text of Caridad Bravo Adams, it was translated into the Portuguese for Enrique Zambelli and Simoni Boer, with supervision of text of Ecila Pedroso and general direction of teledramaturgia of David Grimberg. It had 118 chapters.

Bianca Castanho and Gustavo Haddad are the main protagonists. Débora Duarte, Helena Fernandes, Oscar Magrini are the main antagonists.

Cast

Ibope
It had a good performance in the Ibope, with increasing indices of hearing:
 the 13 of October 13 of November - 13 points
 the 14 of November 14 of December - 16 points *
 the 15 of December 15 of January - 9 points
 the 16 of January 16 of February - 20 points
 the 17 of February 22 of March - 17 points

Its general average was of 15 points

Version
 In 1996 he performed the original version, Cañaveral de pasiones, soap opera's original Caridad Bravo Adams produced by Humberto Zurita and Christian Bach, starring Daniela Castro, Juan Soler and Francisco Gattorno.
 In 2012 he performed the new version, Abismo de pasión'' is a Mexican telenovela executive producer for Angelli Nesma Medina and written by Caridad Bravo Adams, a remake since 1996. Angelique Boyer and David Zepeda are the main protagonists. Blanca Guerra, Mark Tacher, Altair Jarabo and Sabine Moussier are the main antagonists.

2003 Brazilian television series debuts
2004 Brazilian television series endings
2003 telenovelas
Brazilian telenovelas
Sistema Brasileiro de Televisão telenovelas
Brazilian television series based on Mexican television series
Portuguese-language telenovelas